The acronym RMAF may refer to: 
 The Royal Malaysian Air Force 
 The Royal Moroccan Air Force 
 The Ramon Magsaysay Award Foundation